Ancistrus karajas is a species of catfish in the family Loricariidae. It is native to South America, where it occurs in headwater streams of the Parauapebas River, which is part of the Tocantins River basin in Brazil. The species was described in 2016 by Renildo R. de Oliveira, Lúcia H. Rapp Py-Daniel, Cláudio Henrique Zawadzki, and Jansen A. S. Zuanon on the basis of morphology and color patterning. FishBase does not list this species.

References 

karajas
Fish described in 2016